Shannon Marie Curfman (born July 31, 1985, Fargo, North Dakota) is an American blues-rock guitarist and singer.

Career
She came to prominence in 1999, at the age of 14, with the release of her first album, Loud Guitars, Big Suspicions, which she recorded a year earlier.

Curfman self-released a five-song EP entitled Take It Like a Man in July 2006, followed by the full-length album Fast Lane Addiction in 2007. She released her third album, What You're Getting Into, in 2010.

Since 2010, Curfman has been a vocalist and guitarist with Kid Rock's backing band Twisted Brown Trucker.

Discography

Albums
Loud Guitars, Big Suspicions (1999), Arista
Take It Like a Man (2006), Purdy – EP
Fast Lane Addiction (2007), Purdy
What You're Getting Into (2010), Purdy

References

External links
Shannon Curfman official site

1985 births
Living people
American blues guitarists
American rock guitarists
Blues rock musicians
People from Fargo, North Dakota
Musicians from Minneapolis
Guitarists from North Dakota
Guitarists from Minnesota
Arista Records artists
21st-century American women guitarists
21st-century American guitarists